Peshwaj (peshwaz, paswaj, tilluck, dress) was a ladies outfit similar to a gown or jama coat with front open, tied around the waist, having full sleeves, and the length was full neck to heels. Peshwaj was one of the magnificent costumes of the mughal court ladies. The material was used to be sheer and fine muslins with decorated borders of zari and lacework.

Style 
The ladies' attire was a combination of  Peshwaj, trousers, decorative patka, a cap (edged with lace or brocade), shaluka, angia (bodice) and an odhani to cover the upper part of the body and head. The central opening of Peshwaj was covered by the phentas tucked in at the waist.  The Mughal Paintings depicted ladies wearing various outfits such as Peshwaj and heavy jewelry. It was a famous costume in the 17th century for both Hindu and Muslim ladies.

Peshwaj was paired with Ekpatta.

Mentions 
There are eleven types of such coats are mentioned in the Ain-i-Akbari,  Abu'l-Fazl ibn Mubarak explained Takauchiyah was a coat with round skirt tied on the right side. And Peshwaj, as an open in front and tied in front. Added to the same there were sixty ornamental stitches for these royal coats.

Present 
Peshwaj is in use in many parts of India. It is a much-appreciated costume for wedding ceremonies in India and Pakistan. Bhakhtawar Bhutto wore a pink Peshwaj dress at her engagement. Soha Ali Khan wore Ritu Kumar designed Peshwaz dress at her Mehndi. Khushi Kapoor was praised when she donned the Peshwaz dress designed by Manish Malhotra.

See also 
 Shaluka
 Jama (coat)

References 

Costume by period
Women's clothing